On 20 October 2021, two improvised explosive devices attached to a Syrian Army bus exploded as the vehicle passed under Jisr al-Rais Bridge in Damascus, Syria, during morning rush hour, killing 14 people. A third device was defused by an army engineering unit.

It is the deadliest bombing in Syria's capital city since the March 2017 Damascus bombings, in which dozens of people were killed.

Attack 
An army bus carrying troops was blown up near a bridge in the centre of Damascus after two bombs were attached to the bus prior to departure, with a third defused by Army engineers.

About an hour after the explosion, Ariha in Idlib Governorate in the northwest of the country was shelled. The territory is controlled by rebels who are fighting against the government.

Aftermath 
The group "Qasioun Brigades" released a statement claiming responsibility for the attack. They said that such attacks will continue in response to "the massacres carried out by the regime on a daily basis against civilians in the liberated north."

References 

2021 in the Syrian civil war
2021 murders in Syria
21st-century mass murder in Syria
Bus bombings in Asia
Improvised explosive device bombings in 2021
Improvised explosive device bombings in Damascus
October 2021 crimes in Asia
2021